Wayne Township is one of nine townships in DuPage County, Illinois, USA.  As of the 2010 census, its population was 66,582 and it contained 21,787 housing units.

Geography

Cities, towns, villages
 Bartlett (partial)
 Carol Stream (west quarter)
 Hanover Park (partial)
 St. Charles (partial)
 Wayne (partial)
 West Chicago (partial)

Unincorporated towns
 Ingalton at 
 Lakewood at 
 Munger at 
 Prince Crossing at 
 Schick at 
 Wayne Center at 
(This list is based on USGS data and may include former settlements.)

Ghost Town
 Ontarioville at

Adjoining Townships
 Hanover Township, Cook County (north)
 Schaumburg Township, Cook County (northeast)
 Bloomingdale Township, DuPage County (east)
 Milton Township, DuPage County (southeast)
 Winfield Township, DuPage County (south)
 Geneva Township, Kane County (southwest)
 St. Charles Township, Kane County (west)
 Elgin Township, Kane County (northwest)

Cemeteries
The township contains these three cemeteries: Illinois Pet, Ontarioville and Wayne Township.

Major highways
  U.S. Route 20
  Illinois Route 59
  Illinois Route 64

Airports and landing strips
 DuPage County Airport
 Van Kampen Heliport

Landmarks
 Dupage County Airport (north quarter)
 Dupage County Forest Preserve - Pratt Wayne Woods Forest Preserve
 West Branch Reservoir Forest Preserve

Demographics

Township government
The Township government consists of a Board of Trustees (Supervisor and four Trustees) and two officers (Clerk and Assessor) all elected to four-year terms by the voters at-large.

Township roadways are under the jurisdiction of the Wayne Township Road District, a special taxing district separate from the Township.  The Highway Commissioner serves as chief executive of the Road District and is elected to a four-year term by the voters at-large.

Township elections are held in April of the year immediately following a presidential election (2005, 2009, 2013, etc.). The current officers were elected in April 2009. They are:

School districts
 School District 46
 St Charles Community Unit School District 303
School District 25 - Bendist25.org
Evergreen Elementary
Benjamin Middle School
Community High School District 94 in West Chicago
CCSD 93 - Heritage Lakes (maybe others as well)
Glenbard North HS

Political districts
 Illinois's 6th congressional district
 Illinois's 14th congressional district
 State House District 55
 State House District 56
 State Senate District 23
 State Senate District 28

References
 
 United States Census Bureau 2008 TIGER/Line Shapefiles
 United States National Atlas

External links
 City-Data.com
 Illinois State Archives
 Township Officials of Illinois

Townships in DuPage County, Illinois
1849 establishments in Illinois
Townships in Illinois